Uncial 0233 (in the Gregory-Aland numbering), is a Greek uncial manuscript of the New Testament. The manuscript paleographically had been assigned to the 8th-century.

Description 

It contains a text of the four Gospels, on 93 parchment leaves (27 by 21 cm), with some lacunae. The text is written in two columns per page, 23-27 lines per page.

It is a palimpsest, the upper text was written in a minuscule hand, it is a Lectionary 1684. In result the manuscript has two texts of the New Testament, and it is classified on two different lists: on the list of uncials and on the list of lectionaries.

Text 

The Greek text of the codex is a representative of the Alexandrian text-type heavily interpolated by the Byzantine readings. Kurt Aland placed it in Category III (with the profile of 471, 232, 31/2, 5s).

 Textual variants
(The words before the bracket are of UBS edition, the words after the bracket are the readings of the codex).
 Matthew 2:21 – εισηλθεν ] ηλθεν (went) — D, L, W, 0250, f1, f13, ℳ
 Matthew 6:13 – it contains doxology
 Matthew 11:2 – Χριστου ] Ιησου (supported by Codex Bezae, 1424, ℓ 241, and other)

History 

It is dated by the Institute for New Testament Textual Research to the 8th-century.

The manuscript was added to the list of the New Testament manuscripts by Kurt Aland in 1954.

The codex used to be housed at the Bible Museum Münster (MS. 1), in the University of Münster.

See also 
 List of New Testament uncials
 List of New Testament lectionaries
 Textual criticism
 Bible Museum Münster

References

External links 
 Uncial 0233 at the Wieland Willker, "Textual Commentary"

Greek New Testament uncials
8th-century biblical manuscripts
Palimpsests